Network society is the expression coined in 1991 related to the social, political, economic and cultural changes caused by the spread of networked, digital information and communications technologies. The intellectual origins of the idea can be traced back to the work of early social theorists such as Georg Simmel who analyzed the effect of modernization and industrial capitalism on complex patterns of affiliation, organization, production and experience.

Origins
The term network society was coined by Jan van Dijk in his 1991 Dutch book De Netwerkmaatschappij (The Network Society) and by Manuel Castells in The Rise of the Network Society (1996), the first part of his trilogy The Information Age. In 1978 James Martin used the related term 'The Wired Society' indicating a society that is connected by mass- and telecommunication networks. 

Van Dijk defines the network society as a society in which a combination of social and media networks shapes its prime mode of organization and most important structures at all levels (individual, organizational and societal). He compares this type of society to a mass society that is shaped by groups, organizations and communities ('masses') organized in physical co-presence.

Barry Wellman, Hiltz and Turoff
Wellman studied the network society as a sociologist at the University of Toronto. His first formal work was in 1973, "The Network City" with a more comprehensive theoretical statement in 1988. Since his 1979 "The Community Question", Wellman has argued that societies at any scale are best seen as networks (and "networks of networks") rather than as bounded groups in hierarchical structures. More recently, Wellman has contributed to the theory of social network analysis with an emphasis on individualized networks, also known as "networked individualism". In his studies, Wellman focuses on three main points of the network society: community, work and organizations. He states that with recent technological advances an individual's community can be socially and spatially diversified. Organizations can also benefit from the expansion of networks in that having ties with members of different organizations can help with specific issues.

In 1978, Roxanne Hiltz and Murray Turoff's The Network Nation explicitly built on Wellman's community analysis, taking the book's title from Craven and Wellman's "The Network City". The book argued that computer supported communication could transform society. It was remarkably prescient, as it was written well before the advent of the Internet. Turoff and Hiltz were the progenitors of an early computer supported communication system, called EIES.

Manuel Castells
According to Castells, networks constitute the new social morphology of our societies.  When interviewed by Harry Kreisler from the University of California Berkeley, Castells said "...the definition, if you wish, in concrete terms of a network society is a society where the key social structures and activities are organized around electronically processed information networks. So it's not just about networks or social networks, because social networks have been very old forms of social organization. It's about social networks which process and manage information and are using micro-electronic based technologies." The diffusion of a networking logic substantially modifies the operation and outcomes in processes of production, experience, power, and culture. For Castells, networks have become the basic units of modern society. Van Dijk does not go that far; for him these units still are individuals, groups, organizations and communities, though they may increasingly be linked by networks.

The network society goes further than the information society that is often proclaimed. Castells argues that it is not purely the technology that defines modern societies, but also cultural, economic and political factors that make up the network society.  Influences such as religion, cultural upbringing, political organizations, and social status all shape the network society. Societies are shaped by these factors in many ways. These influences can either raise or hinder these societies. For van Dijk, information forms the substance of contemporary society, while networks shape the organizational forms and infrastructures of this society.

The space of flows plays a central role in Castells' vision of the network society. It is a network of communications, defined by hubs where these networks crisscross. Élites in cities are not attached to a particular locality but to the space of flows.

Castells puts great importance on the networks and argues that the real power is to be found within the networks rather than confined in global cities. This contrasts with other theorists who rank cities hierarchically.

Jan van Dijk
Van Dijk has defined the idea "network society" as a form of society increasingly organizing its relationships in media networks gradually replacing or complementing the social networks of face-to-face communication. Personal and social-network communication is supported by digital technology.  This means that social and media networks are shaping the prime mode of organization and most important structures of modern society.

Van Dijk's The Network Society describes what the network society is and what it might be like in the future.  The first conclusion of this book is that modern society is in a process of becoming a network society.  This means that on the internet interpersonal, organizational, and mass communication come together. People become linked to one another and have access to information and communication with one another constantly. Using the internet brings the “whole world” into homes and work places.  Also, when media like the internet becomes even more advanced it will gradually appear as “normal media” in the first decade of the 21st century as it becomes used by larger sections of the population and by vested interests in the economy, politics and culture. It asserts that paper means of communication will become out of date, with newspapers and letters becoming ancient forms for spreading information.

Interaction with new media

New media is the concept that new methods of communicating in the digital world allow smaller groups of people to congregate online and share, sell and swap goods and information. It also allows more people to have a voice in their community and in the world in general. The most important structural characteristic of new media is the integration of telecommunications technologies. The second structural new media characteristic of the current communications revolution is the rise of interactive media. Interactivity is a sequence of action and reaction. The downloaded link or the supply side of web sites, interactive television and computer programs is much wider that the uplink or retrieval made by their users. The third, technical, characteristic of new media is digital code.  The new media are defined by all three characteristics simultaneously: “they are media which are both integrated and interactive and also use digital code at the turn of the 20th and 21st centuries.”

The network society is a social structure based on networks operated by information and communication technologies based on microelectronics and digital computer networks that generate, process and distribute information via the nodes of the networks. The network society can be defined as a social formation with an infrastructure of social and media networks enabling its prime mode of organization at all levels (individual, group, organizational and societal). Increasingly, these networks link all units or parts of this formation. In western societies, the individual linked by networks is becoming the basic unit of the network society. In eastern societies, this might still be the group (family, community, work team) linked by networks. In the contemporary process of individualisation, the basic unit of the network society has become the individual who is linked by networks. This is caused by simultaneous scale extension (nationalisation and internationalisation) and scale reduction (smaller living and working environments)  Other kinds of communities arise. Daily living and working environments are getting smaller and more heterogenous, while the range of the division of labour, interpersonal communications and mass media extends. So, the scale of the network society is both extended and reduced as compared to the mass society. The scope of the network society is both global and local, sometimes indicated as “glocal”. The organization of its components (individuals, groups, organizations) is no longer tied to particular times and places. Aided by information and communication technology, these coordinates of existence can be transcended to create virtual times and places and to simultaneously act, perceive and think in global and local terms.

A network can be defined as a collection of links between elements of a unit. The elements are called nodes, units are often called systems. The smallest number of elements is three and the smallest number of links is two. A single link of two elements is called relationship. Networks are mode of organization of complex systems in nature and society. They are relatively complicated ways of organizing matter and living systems. The characteristic of units and elements, among them human individuals, and the way they are made up, are not the focus of attention. So, networks occur both in complicated matter and in living systems at all levels. Networks are selective according to their specific programs, because they can simultaneously communicate and incommunicate, the network society diffuses in the entire world, but does not include all people. In fact, in this early 21st century, it excludes most of humankind, although all of humankind is affected by its logic and by the power relationships that interact in the global networks of social organization.

Networks are not new. What is new is the microelectronics-based, networking technologies that provide new capabilities to an old form of social organization: networks. Networks throughout history had a major problem vis-a-vis other forms of social organization. Thus, in the historical record, networks were the domains of the private life. Digital networking technologies enable networks to overcome their historical limits. They can, at the same time, be flexible and adaptive thanks to their capacity to decentralize performance along a network of autonomous components, while still being able to coordinate all this decentralized activity on a shared purpose of decision making. Networks are not determined by the industrial technologies but unthinkable without these technologies. In the early years of the 21st century, the network society is not the emerging social structure of the Information Age: it already configures the nucleus of our societies.

There is an explosion of horizontal networks of communication, quite independent from media business and governments, that allows the emergence of what can be called self-directed mass communication. It is mass communication because it is diffused throughout the Internet, so it potentially reaches the whole planet. It is self-directed because it is often initiated by individuals or groups by themselves bypassing the media system. The explosion of blogs, vlogs, podding, streaming and other forms of interactive, computer to computer communication set up a new system of global, horizontal communication Networks that, for the first time in history, allow people to communicate with each other without going through the channels set up by the institutions of society for socialized communication.

The network society constitutes socialized communication beyond the mass media system that characterized the industrial society. But it does not represent the world of freedom sung by the libertarian ideology of Internet prophets. It is made up both of an oligopolistic business multimedia system controlling an increasingly inclusive hypertext, and of an explosion of horizontal Networks of autonomous local/global communication-and, naturally, of the interaction between the two systems in a complex pattern of connections and disconnections in different contexts. The network society is also manifested in the transformation of sociability. Yet, what we observe is not the fading away of face-to-face interaction or the increasing isolation of people in front of their computers. We know, from studies in different societies, that are most instances Internet users are more social have more friends and contacts and re more socially politically active than non users. Moreover, the more they use the Internet, the more they also engage in face to-face interaction in all domains of their lives. Similarly, new forms of wireless communication, from mobile phone voice communication to SMSs, WiFi and WiMax, substantially increase sociability, particularly for the younger groups of the population. The network society is a hyper social society, not a society of isolation. People, by and large, do not face their identity in the Internet, except for some teenagers experimenting with their lives. People fold the technology into their lives, link up virtual reality and real virtuality; they live in various technological forms of communication, articulating them as they need it. However, there is a major change in sociability, not a consequence of Internet or new communication technologies but a change that is fully supported by the logic embedded in the communication networks. This is the emergence of networked individualism, as social structure and historical evolution induce the emergence of individualism as the dominant culture of our societies, and the new communication Technologies perfectly fit into the mode of building sociability along self-selected communication networks, on or off depending on the needs and moods of each individual. So, the network society is a society of networked individuals.

What results from this evolution is that the culture of the network society is largely shaped by the messages exchanged in the composite electronic hypertext made by the technologically linked networks of different communication modes. In the network society, virtuality is the foundation of reality through the new forms of socialized communication. Society shapes technology according to the needs, values and interests of people who use the technology. Furthermore, information and communication technologies are particularly sensitive to the effects of social uses on technology itself. The history of the internet provides ample evidence that the users, particularly the first thousands of users, were, to a large extent, the producers of the technology. However, technology is a necessary, albeit not sufficient condition for the emergence of a new form of social organization based on networking, that is on the diffusion of networking in all realms of activity on the basis of digital communication networks.

Modern Examples
The concepts described by Jan van Dijk, Barry Wellman, Hiltz and Turoff, and Manuel Castells are embodied in much digital technology. Social networking sites such as Facebook and Twitter, instant messaging and email are prime examples of the Network Society at work. These web services allow people all over the world to communicate through digital means without face-to-face contact. This demonstrates how the ideas of society changing will affect the persons we communicate over time.
Network society does not have any confinements and has found its way to the global scale. Network society is developed in modern society that allows for a great deal of information to be traded to help improve information and communication technologies.  Having this luxury of easier communication also has consequences. This allows for globalization to take place. Having more and more people joining the online society and learning about different techniques with the world wide web. This benefits users who have access to the internet, to stay connected at all times with any topic the user wants. Individuals without internet may be affected because they are not directly connected into this society. People always have an option to find public space with computers with internet. This allows a user to keep up with the ever changing system. Network society is constantly changing the “cultural production in a hyper-connected world.” 
Social Structures revolve around the relationship of the “production/consumption, power, and experience.” These conclusively create a culture, which continues to sustain by getting new information constantly. Our society system was a mass media system where it was a more general place for information. Now the system is more individualized and custom system for users making the internet more personal. This makes messages to the audience more inclusive sent into society. Ultimately allowing more sources to be included to better communication. Network society is seen as a global system that helps with globalization. This is beneficial to the people who have access to the internet to get this media. The negative to this is the people without access do not get this sense of the network society. These networks, that have now been digitized, are more efficient of connecting people. Everything we know now can be put into a computer and processed. Users put messages online for others to read and learn about. This allows people to gain knowledge faster and more efficiently. Networked society allows for people to connect to each other quicker and to engage more actively. This networks go away from having a central theme, but still has a focus in what it is there to accomplish.

See also

References

External links

 The Network Society on Googlebooks
 Interview with Manuel Castells

Sociological terminology
Information society
Information Age
Information economy

sl:Spletna skupnost (tipologije)